Joanna Elisabeth of Holstein-Gottorp (24 October 1712 – 30 May 1760) was a member of the German House of Holstein-Gottorp, a princess consort of Anhalt-Zerbst by marriage, and the regent of Anhalt-Zerbst from 1747 to 1752 on behalf of her minor son, Frederick Augustus. She is best known as the mother of Empress Catherine the Great of Russia.

Early life
Joanna Elisabeth was born as the daughter of Christian August, Duke of Holstein-Gottorp (1673–1726), Prince of Eutin and Prince-Bishop of Lübeck and his wife, Albertina Frederica of Baden-Durlach (1682–1755). She was a member of the influential House of (Schleswig-)Holstein-Gottorp, but only from a minor branch. Since her father was not rich, but had a total of eleven children, he sent Joanna to the court of her godmother, Elisabeth Sophie Marie of Schleswig-Holstein-Norburg (1683–1767), who had no children of her own. Joanna was thus brought up in one of the most luxurious courts of Northern Germany, together with the three daughters of Elisabeth Sophie Marie's husband, Augustus William, Duke of Brunswick-Wolfenbüttel (1662–1731).

In 1727, the fifteen-year-old Joanna was married to the thirty-seven-year old Prince Christian August of Anhalt-Zerbst (1690–1747), who was an heir to the Principality of Anhalt-Zerbst and a general in the Prussian Army under Frederick William I of Prussia. After the wedding, the couple lived in the small city of Stettin, Pomerania (later known as Szczecin, Poland), where the husband's regiment was stationed.

Princess of Anhalt-Zerbst

The marriage of Joanna and Christian August turned out to be a mismatch, both because of their large age gap and their different personalities. The soldier husband was a sober and simple man, used to giving orders and not talking much, while his young wife loved socializing. In addition, Christian August could only afford a small townhouse on his military pay, but Joanna was used to the luxury of the ducal court of Brünswick. There was also very little entertainment in Stettin compared to the life Joanna had lived as a child, which was full of balls, hunts, and theatre plays. Joanna was unhappy, but remained an obedient and dutiful wife.

Eighteen months after the wedding, on 21 April 1729, Joanna gave birth to her first child. Everyone had hoped for a son who would have been an heir to his father, including Joanna, who wanted to raise a great ruler with a brighter career than her own as a compensation for having had to marry a minor prince. To Joanna's great disappointment, the baby was a girl. She was named Sophie Auguste Friederike, and would later become Empress Catherine the Great of Russia. The labour was intense and life-threatening for Joanna, who had to lie in bed for 19 weeks after the birth to recover. She handed her child over to nurses and servants (as was customary in the era for noble mothers), and did not show her affection.

On 22 January 1729, Christian August was appointed commander of Stettin, which meant that the couple could move into the castle in the middle of the city. Still, Joanna was not satisfied with her position and her isolation from culture and high society, and started travelling to escape her home. She often visited Brünswick, her childhood home, and she paid her respects to the King of Prussia every February in the carnival season. Much to her dismay, she was treated as a poor relative everywhere, pitied for having had to marry someone below her in rank. In these years, she had three more children. On 17 November 1730, Joanna gave birth to William Christian Frederick, who suffered from rickets and was her favorite. On 8 August 1734, Joanna gave birth to Frederick Augustus, who would succeed his father as Prince of Anhalt-Zerbst. On 10 November 1736, Joanna gave birth to Auguste Charlotte Christine, who died at the age of two weeks.

Joanna's relationship with her eldest child remained strained. According to Sophie's memoirs, Joanna was often violent and angry towards her for no reason. However, she wanted Sophie to contract an advantageous marriage, so she started bringing her along on her journeys from the age of 8. In 1739, they visited Joanna's brother, Adolf Frederick, Prince-Bishop of Lübeck (1710–1771). Adolf Frederick had recently become the guardian of Charles Peter Ulrich, the eleven-year-old orphaned duke of Holstein-Gottorp and only living grandchild of Emperor Peter the Great of Russia (1672–1725), who was a prospective heir to both the Russian Empire and the Kingdom of Sweden.

In 1741, Grand Duchess Elizabeth Petrovna of Russia ascended to the throne as empress. Elizabeth had once been engaged to Joanna's brother Charles Augustus (1706–1727), who died shortly before the wedding, and Elizabeth cherished his memory for her whole life. Johanna was quick to write a congratulatory letter, and later sent a portrait of Elizabeth's deceased sister, Grand Duchess Anna Petrovna, for which she received a very valuable portrait of the Empress. To further the relationship, Joanna sent a portrait of Sophie to the Empress, who was pleased with her beauty.

Meanwhile, the illness of William Christian, Joanna's favourite child, was becoming more and more severe, despite regular cures in Baden-Baden and Karlsbad. William he died on 27 August 1742, and Johanna was inconsolable. A few months later, on 17 December, she gave birth to her fifth and last child, a daughter. Joanna asked to be allowed to name her after the Empress of Russia, who became the little Elisabeth Ulrike's godmother.

In January 1742, Empress Elizabeth brought Peter Ulrich, Duke of Holstein-Gottorp and only child of her late beloved sister Anna Petrovna, to Saint Petersburg. Empress Elizabeth adopted Peter and appointed him as her heir. In turn, Peter renounced his claim to the Swedish throne, and Elizabeth was able to appoint the new heir. She chose Peter Ulrich's guardian, Joanna's older brother, Adolf Frederick, which elevated Joanna in rank. In November 1742, Christian August inherited the Principality of Anhalt-Zerbst with his brother, John Louis, and the family moved to Zerbst.

In Russia 
On 1 January 1744 at dinner, Joanna was handed a letter from Otto Brümmer, the Grand Marshal of Grand Duke Peter's court (Peter Ulrich had since converted to Russian Orthodoxy and had taken the name Pyotr Fyodorovich). In the letter, Brümmer asked Johanna to visit Russia with her eldest daughter, Sophie, as soon as possible on the command of the Empress. Only a few hours later, a letter from Frederick II of Prussia followed; this letter informed Joanna that Frederick saw a possibility to arrange a marriage between Peter and Sophie. On 10 January, Prince Christian August, Princess Joanna, and Princess Sophie traveled to Berlin to see Frederick II. Here, the King secretly asked Joanna to become an agent of Prussia in Saint Petersburg, with the intent to remove Vice Chancellor Count Alexey Petrovich Bestuzhev(-Ryumin) (1693–1768), an enemy of Prussia who wanted Russia to be allied with Austria, and who opposed the marriage of Peter and Sophie. Johanna enthusiastically accepted.

On 16 January, the family and their company left Berlin. Fifty miles (appr. 80 km) from Berlin, Christian August said goodbye and returned to Zerbst, as the Empress had requested him not to go to Russia. Joanna took the pseudonym of "Countess Reinbeck" for the journey to hide her identity and the marriage plans. The travel was very uncomfortable, they often had to sleep in scarcely furnished, roach-infested hotels. On 9 February (O.S.), they arrived in Moscow, just in time for the celebration of Grand Duke Peter's sixteenth birthday. Soon after their arrival, Johanna received news that her infant daughter Elisabeth Ulrike had suddenly died in Zerbst on 5 March (N.S.).

At first, Joanna had a cordial relationship with Empress Elizabeth, often expressing gratitude for her kindness towards her family. However, when Sophie fell ill and the doctors wanted to bleed her, she refused to allow it. Joanna's refusal angered the Empress, who then removed Joanna from her daughter's bed and tended to Sophie herself. Joanna's constant complaining during this period caused her to become disliked in the Russian court. While in Russia, Joanna was also working on the mission she received from the King of Prussia, trying to undermine Vice Chancellor Bestuzhev. Bestuzhev intercepted letters passing between Johanna, the Prussian and the French ambassador, and the Prussian and French courts. When he eventually presented their copies to the Empress, she was furious and declared that Joanna must leave Russia right after the wedding. Between the betrothal and the wedding, Johanna's relationship with her future son-in-law also deteriorated.

On 21 August 1745 (O.S.), Sophie and Peter married. A few weeks later, Joanna had to leave Russia. Joanna did not say goodbye to Sophie (now known as Grand Duchess Catherine Alexeievna) and would never see her again. Joanna left with many presents from the Empress. In Riga, she was directed to take a message to the King of Prussia, asking him to call back the ambassador who had been caught in the conspiracy against Bestuzhev. This request was a humiliating punishment for Joanna's part in the plot.

Regency and later life

On 16 March 1747, Joanna's husband, Christian August, died. Their son Frederick Augustus succeeded him as Prince of Anhalt-Zerbst. During his minority, Joanna acted as regent. She had a new palace built in Dornburg for the purpose of hosting her brother, King Adolf Frederick of Sweden, and her daughter, the Grand Duchess, but neither of them ever visited. In 1758, during the Seven Years' War, Prussia invaded Anhalt-Zerbst, and the Dowager Princess and her son were forced into exile in Paris. Joanna died there in 1760 at the age of 47. Two years later, her daughter became the Empress regnant of Russia. Her son, Frederick Augustus, never returned to Zerbst.

Appearance and personality 
In her youth, Joanna Elisabeth was regarded as beautiful, and had curly, blonde hair. She easily befriended people with overt kindness. She made efforts to charm others when she was in company. She also talked a great deal and was easily agitated.

Issue

Johanna married Christian August on 8 November 1727 in Vechelde. She had five children:

Sophie of Anhalt-Zerbst (2 May 1729 – 17 November 1796), who later became Catherine the Great, Empress of Russia.
William Christian Frederick of Anhalt-Zerbst (17 November 1730 – 27 August 1742), died young.
Frederick Augustus, Prince of Anhalt-Zerbst (8 August 1734 – 3 March 1793), succeeded his father as Prince of Anhalt-Zerbst and died without issue.
Auguste Christine Charlotte of Anhalt-Zerbst (10 November 1736 – 24 November 1736), died in infancy.
Elisabeth Ulrike of Anhalt-Zerbst (17 December 1742 – 5 March 1745), died in infancy.

Ancestry

In popular culture
Joanna appears as a character in the historical novel A Princess at the Court of Russia by Eva Martens. She was played by Isabelle Schosing in the 2014 Russia-1 historical television drama-documentary Ekaterina and by Gillian Anderson in season two of the loosely historically based series The Great.

References 

1712 births
1760 deaths
18th-century women rulers
Regents of Germany
Duchesses of Holstein-Gottorp
House of Ascania
18th-century German people
Princesses of Anhalt-Zerbst
Royal reburials